Samuel Charles Black was the fifth president of Washington & Jefferson College.

Black was born on September 6, 1869, at Monticello, Iowa and graduated from Parsons College. He was Washington & Jefferson College on April 18, 1919, and was inaugurated October 22, 1919. By the spring of 1920, the college had the largest enrollment in any one year during its history, increasing from the low point during the World War I years to 368 men freshmen. Black took leave of the college for summer of 1921 to marry. While on a honeymoon tour of national parks in Colorado, he became sick and died in Denver, Colorado on July 25, 1921. He was buried in Clarinda, Iowa, the home of his parents.

Bibliography

References

See also

 Washington & Jefferson College
 President of Washington & Jefferson College

1869 births
Presidents of Washington & Jefferson College
1921 deaths
American Presbyterian ministers
People from Monticello, Iowa